In chemistry, a transition metal ether complex is a coordination complex consisting of a transition metal bonded to one or more ether ligand. The inventory of complexes is extensive.  Common ether ligands are diethyl ether and tetrahydrofuran.  Common chelating ether ligands include the glymes, dimethoxyethane (dme) and diglyme, and the crown ethers. Being lipophilic, metal-ether complexes often exhibit solubility in organic solvents, a property of interest in synthetic chemistry.  In contrast, the di-ether 1,4-dioxane is generally a bridging ligand.

Bonding, structure, reactions

Ethers are L-type ligands. They are σ-donors that exert weak field ligands.  They resemble water ligands as seen in aquo complexes. They do not, however, readily participate in hydrogen bonding.  The ether oxygen is nearly trigonal planar in its complexes.

Being weakly basic, ether ligands tend to be easily displaceable.  Otherwise, ether ligands are relatively unreactive. Cyclic ethers such as thf can ring-open or even deoxygenated when bound to highly electrophilic metal halides.  Thus treatment of tungsten hexachloride with one equivalent of thf gives 1,4-dichlorobutane:

At higher concentrations of thf, polytetrahydrofuran is produced.

Examples

Homoleptic complexes
Ethers are relatively bulky ligands, thus homoleptic (i.e., all ligands being the same) ether complexes are uncommon.   Examples often feature weakly coordinating anions such as BArF4− and Al(ORF)4−.
[V(thf)6](BArF4)2
[Mn(thf)6](Mn(CO)5]2
[[Fe(thf)6]][BArF24]2
[Ni(thf)6][Al(ORF)4 ]2

Metal halide complexes

Metal chloride-tetrahydrofuran complexes are especially studied. These compounds are often reagents because they are soluble in organic solvents as well as being anhydrous.

Metal carbonyl complexes
M(CO)5(thf) (M = Cr, Mo, W)
Mo(CO)3(diglyme)

References

Coordination chemistry
Coordination complexes